Thomas Francis Hurley (born August 29, 1944) is an American former ice hockey defenseman and Olympian.

Hurley played with Team USA at the 1968 Winter Olympics held in Grenoble, France. He previously played for the Clarkson Golden Knights at Clarkson University.

References

External links

1944 births
Living people
Ice hockey players from New York (state)
Ice hockey players at the 1968 Winter Olympics
Olympic ice hockey players of the United States
People from Massena, New York
American men's ice hockey centers
Clarkson Golden Knights men's ice hockey players